Maryan Ivanovych Plakhetko (1 March 1945 – 22 February 2020) was a Ukrainian and Soviet footballer.

Honours
 Soviet Top League winner: 1970.

International career
Plakhetko made his debut for USSR on 16 June 1968 in a friendly match against Austria.

Family
His son Andrei played in CSKA 2, and other Moscow teams. Since 2000, he has been coach of the Sports School of CSKA Moscow.

References

External links
  Profile

1945 births
2020 deaths
People from Drohobych Oblast
Soviet footballers
Soviet Union international footballers
Ukrainian footballers
Russian footballers
PFC CSKA Moscow players
Soviet Top League players
Higher School of Coaches alumni
Association football defenders
Russian football chairmen and investors
Sportspeople from Lviv Oblast